Bhupendrabhai Patel ministry could refer to:
 First Bhupendrabhai Patel ministry
 Second Bhupendrabhai Patel Ministry